Johan "John" Hjalmar Lindroth (17 September 1883 – 24 July 1960) was a Finnish gymnast who won bronze in the 1908 Summer Olympics.

Sport 

He was a board member of the Finnish Shooting Sport Federation in 1927–.

Biography 

His parents were farmer Hugo Gustaf Lindroth and Maria Elisabeth Hannula. His three marriages were:
 In 1909, singer Anna Emilia Paulina Fritsch (1887–1921)
 In 1922, Gudrun Lindskog (1902–), divorced in 1944
 In 1951, artist Sophie Isabella Adele Lave (1918–)
He had five children:
 Maire (1916–)
 Margaretha (1921–)
 Marjatta (1925–)
 Mielikki Elisabeth (1928–)
 John Gustav (1952–)

He took his matriculation exam in Porin Lyseo in 1904, graduated as a Licentiate of Medicine in 1922 and specialized in internal medicine in 1929. He worked as the municipal doctor of Vantaa in 1917–1924. He opened a private practice in Helsinki in 1924. He also worked at the Helsinki general hospital and the military reaching the rank of major in 1942.

He received the Cross of Liberty, 4th class in 1940 and 3rd class in 1942.

Sources

References 

1883 births
1960 deaths
Finnish male artistic gymnasts
Gymnasts at the 1908 Summer Olympics
Olympic gymnasts of Finland
Olympic bronze medalists for Finland
Olympic medalists in gymnastics
Medalists at the 1908 Summer Olympics